Rémi Allier (born March 2, 1988) is a French director.

In 2019 he received a César Award for his short film Little Hands.

Biography
After attending the Lumière high school in Lyon and a BTS diploma in "editing and post production" in Paris,<ref>[https://www.macon-infos.com/index.php?option=com_content&view=article&id=20471:cesar-2019-petites-main-de-remi-allier-realisateur-d-origine-maconnaise-selectionne&catid=88&Itemid=503&lang=fr Article du 23 février 2019 sur le site Mâcon Infos]</ref> Allier studied filmmaking at the IAD in Louvain-la-Neuve, Belgium.

In February 2019 he received the César Award for his short film Little Hands.

He is currently living in Brussels.

FilmographyJan (2012) - co-director with Pablo Muñoz Gomez (short film)Zinneke (2013) - writer, director (student short film)Little Hands'' (2017) - writer, director (short film)

References

External links

Living people
1988 births
French film directors
César Award winners
People from Mâcon